Pouteria atabapoensis is a species of plant in the family Sapotaceae. It is found in Brazil and Venezuela.

References

atabapoensis
Flora of Brazil
Flora of Venezuela
Near threatened plants
Near threatened biota of South America
Taxonomy articles created by Polbot
Taxa named by André Aubréville